William Louis Sonntag Sr. (1822–1900) was an American landscape painter.

Life and work
Born near Pittsburgh, Pennsylvania in 1822, he traveled to Cincinnati, Ohio, at the age of 21 and perfected his technique. Becoming an established and highly regarded landscape artist, he began making trips to Florence, Italy in 1853. Several of these trips were made with his friend Robert Seldon Duncanson.

In 1856, Sonntag permanently moved to New York to become a leading painter of Romantic landscapes of several scenes from his travels in Italy. Sonntag was a member of the group known as the Hudson River School. Some of his paintings go beyond the movement to a grandiose expression of Manifest Destiny.

There is strong evidence that several of Sonntag's pieces were scenes he had seen from photographs only.  Grand Canyon, Yellowstone River, Wyoming, for example, is a landscape that Sonntag never traveled to.  It is most likely based on a photograph taken by Frank Jay Haynes of the canyon in 1885.

His son, William Louis Sonntag Jr. (1869–1898), was also a painter, and an illustrator.

Gallery

References

External links

American Paradise: The World of the Hudson River School, an exhibition catalog from The Metropolitan Museum of Art (fully available online as PDF), which contains material on Sonntag Sr. (see index).
 
 
Artwork by William Louis Sonntag

American landscape painters
1822 births
1900 deaths
Artists from Pennsylvania
Artists from Cincinnati
Hudson River School painters
19th-century American painters
American male painters
19th-century American male artists